Nihonryori Ryugin (Japanese:  lit. "Japanese cuisine singing dragon") is a Michelin 3-star fusion cuisine restaurant located in Hibiya, Chiyoda-ku, Tokyo. The chef is Seiji Yamamoto (山本 征治).

History 
Ryugin was established in 2003 at Roppongi, Minato-ku, Tokyo. The name "Ryugin" comes from the Zen saying "Ryugin sureba kumo okori" (龍吟雲起), which means "clouds appear when the dragon sings."

Ryugin was ranked 20th in the S.Pellegrino World's 50 Best Restaurants in 2011. It moved to its current location in 2018.

See also
 List of Japanese restaurants
 List of Michelin starred restaurants

References

Restaurants in Japan
Japanese restaurants
Restaurants in Tokyo
Michelin Guide starred restaurants in Japan